Tandoori Nights is a television sitcom that was broadcast on Channel 4 between 1985 and 1987. It consisted of two series of six episodes each. The series was directed by Jon Amiel and written by Farrukh Dhondy. It is the story of two rival restaurants in London, and starred Saeed Jaffrey, Tariq Yunus, Rita Wolf and Zohra Sehgal. It was Channel 4's first Asian comedy series.

After the sitcom had been commissioned to be written, Farrukh Dhondy himself became Channel 4's commissioning editor for multicultural programmes. Meera Syal wrote an episode for the sitcom (4 July 1985).

Tandoori Nights traded on some pre-existing Asian stereotypes: an Indian restaurant setting; a conniving businessman (Jimmy Sharma, played by Saeed Jaffrey) who views dating white women as 'social climbing'; a rebellious daughter (played by Rita Wolf); and a bumbling servant-fool (Alaudin, played by Tariq Yunus).

Plot summary
Jimmy Sharma is the owner of Jewel in the Crown, a Tandoori restaurant on Brick Lane in East London. His rival is The Far Pavilions, the restaurant across the street.

References

External links

1980s British sitcoms
1985 British television series debuts
1987 British television series endings
Asian-British culture
Channel 4 original programming
Channel 4 sitcoms